The City of Mount Isa is a local government area in north west Queensland. The City covers the urban locality of Mount Isa, the administrative centre, and surrounding area, sharing a boundary with the Northern Territory to the west.

Mount Isa is a reasonably affluent district. The largest industry in the city is the Mount Isa Mines, a source of lead, copper, silver and zinc.  Cattle grazing and tourism are other industries of note.

History 
The city was inhabited by the Kalkadoon and Indjilandji people, whose livelihood depended on hunting and gathering, fishing and trade for several thousands of years, before the European settlers arrived here. The Kalkadoon craftsmen were known for their stone implements and handmade tools which were traded with other Aboriginal groups spread all over the western Queensland.

Kalkatunga (also known as Kalkadoon, Kalkadunga, Kalkatungu) is an Australian Aboriginal language. The Kalkatunga language region is North-West Queensland including the local government areas of the City of Mount Isa.

On 10 February 1914, the Shire of Barclay Tableland, based in Camooweal, was incorporated on an area previously managed by the shires of Burke and Cloncurry. On 14 August 1919 the spelling was changed and it became known as Shire of Barkly Tableland. As a consequence of the growth of Mount Isa as a mining and population centre within the shire, an Order in Council dated 15 December 1962 renamed the shire to Shire of Mount Isa, effective 1 July 1963, and its administration centre relocated to Mount Isa. At the same time it gained part of the Shire of Cloncurry. On 30 May 1968, the shire was proclaimed as a City due to the area reaching a population of 18,000.

Towns and localities 
The City of Mount Isa includes the following settlements:

Suburbs of the town of Mount Isa 

Mineside Mount Isa:
 Happy Valley
 Kalkadoon
 Mica Creek
 Miles End
 Parkside
 Soldiers Hill

Townside Mount Isa:
 Breakaway
 Fisher
 Healy
 Lanskey
 Menzies
 Mornington
 Mount Isa City

 Pioneer
 Ryan
 Spreadborough
 Sunset
 The Gap
 Townview
 Winston

Rural areas outside the town 
 Mount Isa (locality)
 Barkly
 Camooweal
 Gunpowder
 Lawn Hill

Amenities 
The Mount Isa City Council operate a public library at Mount Isa City.

Chairmen and mayors

 1927: John Thomson Campbell
 1968–1969: George McCoy
 1969–1973: Bill Weigh
 1973–1975: Angelo Bertoni
 1975–1985: Franz Born
 1985–1989: Tony McGrady
 1989–2008: Ron McCuollough
 2008–2012: John Molony
 2012–2016: Tony McGrady
 2016–2020: Joyce McCulloch
 2020–present: Danielle Dee Slade

Sister cities
Sister cities of Mount Isa include:
 Bankstown, Sydney, New South Wales

Population

References

 
Populated places established in 1914
Local government areas of Queensland
North West Queensland
Mount Isa
1914 establishments in Australia